The canton of Clermont-en-Argonne is an administrative division of the Meuse department, northeastern France. Its borders were modified at the French canton reorganisation which came into effect in March 2015. Its seat is in Clermont-en-Argonne.

It consists of the following communes:
 
Aubréville
Avocourt
Bantheville
Baulny
Béthelainville
Béthincourt
Boureuilles
Brabant-en-Argonne
Brabant-sur-Meuse
Brocourt-en-Argonne
Charpentry
Chattancourt
Cheppy
Cierges-sous-Montfaucon
Le Claon
Clermont-en-Argonne
Consenvoye
Cuisy
Cunel
Dannevoux
Dombasle-en-Argonne
Épinonville
Esnes-en-Argonne
Forges-sur-Meuse
Froidos
Fromeréville-les-Vallons
Futeau
Gercourt-et-Drillancourt
Gesnes-en-Argonne
Les Islettes
Jouy-en-Argonne
Lachalade
Malancourt
Marre
Montblainville
Montfaucon-d'Argonne
Montzéville
Nantillois
Le Neufour
Neuvilly-en-Argonne
Rarécourt
Récicourt
Regnéville-sur-Meuse
Romagne-sous-Montfaucon
Septsarges
Sivry-sur-Meuse
Varennes-en-Argonne
Vauquois
Véry
Vilosnes-Haraumont

References

Cantons of Meuse (department)